Tetheamyrma is a genus of ants in the subfamily Myrmicinae containing the single species Tetheamyrma subspongia. The genus is known only from two workers collected in a leaf litter sample in eastern Malaysia.

References

External links

Myrmicinae
Monotypic ant genera
Hymenoptera of Asia